Jessica Seinfeld (born Nina Danielle Sklar; September 12, 1971) is an American author. She has released five cookbooks about preparing food for families, and is the founder of the GOOD+ Foundation (formerly Baby Buggy), a New York City-based charitable organization that provides essential items for families in need throughout New York City. She is married to comedian Jerry Seinfeld.

Early life
Jessica Nina Sklar was born in Oyster Bay, New York, the middle child of three daughters, and grew up in a middle-class household in Burlington, Vermont. Her mother was a Victims Service Advocate for more than fifty years and an attendance officer at Hunt Middle School, while her father was a computer software engineer.

Career 
After graduating from the University of Vermont, Seinfeld worked in public relations for Golden Books Entertainment and Tommy Hilfiger.

Baby Buggy 
Seinfeld founded Baby Buggy in 2001 following the birth of her first child. She started with a donation drive, whereby she asked people for their used baby supplies after realizing that her first child's products, no longer of use to her own family, could certainly be used by others.

With a motto of "Love. Recycled", Baby Buggy's goal is to help families in need be able to access the essentials for ensuring their safety and well-being. By providing concrete resources to families through a network of social service professionals, Baby Buggy seeks to alleviate the stress of living in poverty and help in the prevention of crisis. As of May 2013, Baby Buggy has donated over six million items to New York families since the organization was established.

Baby Buggy works with a network of over 50 community-based organizations (CBOs) that are carefully selected—each applies annually to become a recipient. Some of the organizations that have partnered with Baby Buggy include organizations working with victims of domestic violence such as Safe Horizon and New York Asian Women's Center, now known as Womankind; multi-service sites including Single Stop East Harlem and Lenox Hill Neighborhood House; prenatal and NICU units at hospitals such as Woodhull and NY Presbyterian; immigrant and refugee-serving organizations including the International Rescue Committee; and parenting programs, such as the Nurse-Family Partnership program and the Harlem Children's Zone's Baby College.

About $2 Million of Baby Buggy's budget is made up of in-kind product donations from individuals and corporations. Financial support for the organization comes from its board of directors, the friends of Baby Buggy group, private individuals, corporations and foundations. As of 2008, 88 cents of every dollar received by Baby Buggy went straight to programs. In 2013, Baby Buggy received its fourth Four Star rating from Charity Navigator. The charity is also an Accredited Charity of the Better Business Bureau.

In July 2010, Baby Buggy launched a layette collection with Target Corporation, with 10% of sales going to help families in need. The layette line was designed by illustrator and children's book author Maira Kalman.

In 2016, Baby Buggy was rebranded as the Good Plus Foundation (also seen as Good+ Foundation). As Baby Buggy, the nonprofit had seen 20 million items donated to families across the United States. Seinfeld shared with "Good Morning America" co-anchor George Stephanopoulos that the charity had outgrown its name. The Good Plus Foundation pairs goods and services in an incentives program. For example, a parent who opens an education savings account will also receive a stroller.

Cookbooks 
In October 2007, Seinfeld released her first cookbook, Deceptively Delicious: Simple Secrets to Get Your Kids Eating Good Food, which contains strategies and recipes for making healthy food appealing to young children. The book features traditional recipes, such as mac and cheese and spaghetti and meatballs, that get a nutritional boost from vegetable purees. Deceptively Delicious was featured on The Oprah Winfrey Show, became a No. 1 New York Times bestseller, remaining on the list for five months after its release. The book also reached No. 1 on Amazon.com and No. 2 on the USA Today bestseller list. Expert Joy Bauer added nutritional advice to the recipes, while Roxana Mehran and Mehmet Oz wrote the foreword. A portion of the royalties from Deceptively Delicious was donated to Baby Buggy.

In October 2010, Seinfeld released her second cookbook, Double Delicious! Good, Simple Food for Busy, Complicated Lives, which shared more healthy twists on traditional recipes, and incorporated vegetable purees, whole grains, and alternatives to processed sugars and flours. Like her first book, Double Delicious! was featured on The Oprah Winfrey Show.

In 2013 she released her third cookbook, The Can't Cook Book, billed as "100 recipes for the absolutely terrified!" In 2017 she released her fourth cookbook, Food Swings.

In 2021, Seinfeld adopted a plant-based diet. She authored a vegan cookbook titled Vegan, at Times for those "who cannot quite commit" to a vegan diet all the time.

Do it Delicious 
In October 2010, Seinfeld launched a website for beginner cooks called "Do it Delicious." The website teaches at-home viewers how to prepare particular dishes or meals step-by-step, as well as a kitchen guide, store, blog, and community forum where users can submit tips and ask how-to questions.

Personal life

In June 1998, she married Eric Nederlander, a theatrical producer and the son of theater owner Robert Nederlander. Several months before the wedding, she met Jerry Seinfeld at a Reebok Sports Club. After returning from a honeymoon in Italy with Nederlander, she began dating Seinfeld. Nederlander filed for divorce in October 1998, only four months after marriage. Sklar and Seinfeld became engaged in November 1999, and were married on December 25, 1999. Comedian George Wallace was the best man at the wedding.

After much criticism from Nederlander on Sklar's divorce and subsequent marriage, the Seinfelds gave a personal account of their relationship to Vogue in 2004. Jessica Seinfeld is quoted as having said, 

Jerry Seinfeld has said, "If it wasn't for Jess and the kids, I'd really blow my brains out. Jessica saved my life. She gave me something to care about."

The Seinfelds have three children, all born in New York City. Daughter Sascha was born November 7, 2000; son Julian Kal on March 1, 2003; and Shepherd Kellen was born on August 22, 2005.

Lawsuit and dismissal
Seinfeld's first book, Deceptively Delicious, was published by HarperCollins on January 7, 2008, and contained a series of recipes to hide pureed fruits and vegetables inside children's meals.

Following her book's release, another cookbook author, Missy Chase Lapine, sued both Seinfelds, accusing Jessica of copyright and trademark infringement. Lapine had unsuccessfully shopped her own manuscript, The Sneaky Chef, to several publishers, including HarperCollins, before publishing with Running Press.

In response to the accusations, Seinfeld denied that either author had invented the idea of hiding fruits and vegetables in children's meals, and asserted that "countless prior works utilized this very same unprotectable idea" in cookbooks dating back to 1971. She claimed, "My book came from years of trying to get my own children to eat healthy foods—my own trial and error in my own kitchen. The idea of pureeing vegetables has been around for decades."

In the same lawsuit, Lapine also accused Jerry Seinfeld of defamation, after he appeared on Late Show with David Letterman on October 29, 2007, and called Lapine "angry and hysterical," a "wacko," a "stalker" and a "nut job," and suggested that "people with three names ... become assassins."

In 2009, U.S. District Court Judge Laura Taylor Swain dismissed all claims against Jessica Seinfeld, but left open the claim of defamation against her husband, to be tried in New York state court. The federal judge ruled that "no reasonable fact finder could conclude" that any copying occurred, and that the books were "very different" and had "a completely different feel."

Lapine appealed the decision, but the dismissal was affirmed by the U.S. Court of Appeals in 2010. In 2011, the state court dismissed the remaining defamation claim against Jerry Seinfeld.

References

External links
 

1971 births
American food writers
American women non-fiction writers
Living people
People from Oyster Bay (town), New York
University of Vermont alumni
Vegan cookbook writers
Women cookbook writers
Women food writers
Writers from New York (state)
Nederlander family
21st-century American women